Brian Coburn (15 December 1936 - 28 December 1989) was a Scottish actor. His stage work included appearances with the Old Vic and the Royal Shakespeare Company, as well as in the West End. He appeared in more than eighty films from 1965 to 1989, his death.

Filmography

References

External links 
 

1936 births
1989 deaths
Scottish male stage actors
Scottish male film actors
British male stage actors
British male film actors
Place of birth missing
20th-century British male actors